Rogerian may refer to:

 Rogerian argument, a conflict solving technique
 Rogerian psychotherapy, one of the major school groups of person-centered psychotherapy